Grand Isle is a 2019 American action thriller film directed by Stephen Campanelli and starring Nicolas Cage. It was released in the United States on January 3, 2020.

Plot

A woman buys cookies from two Girl Scouts and makes one of the girls uncomfortable. Later that night a noise awakens the other house's occupant, who quickly grabs a robe, slippers and a gun before going downstairs where it appears someone is stealing from them. The intruder attempts to flee from a window, but he is shot and killed. The next morning, the body is gone.

A young man with cuts and blood on his face, Buddy (Luke Benward), is in police custody, handcuffed, and being questioned by Detective Jones (Kelsey Grammer) about a murder and the events beforehand.

In a local diner the day before, Buddy is seen trying to entice an uninterested investor. Buddy walks over to the booth with his wife, Lisa (Emily Marie Palmer), who has their 6-month-old baby in a stroller. They discuss their financial and sexual concerns. He tells her he was requested by name to fix someone's fence and that he will try to get an advance. She declines his proposition for sex, and he reluctantly agrees to give her more time.

Buddy drives over to the house from the beginning of the movie, which is owned by Walter (Nicolas Cage), a disheveled veteran. His wife, Fancy (KaDee Strickland) was the woman who bought the cookies earlier. Tension is high between the two of them for several reasons, one being that Walter forgot that that day is their 15-year anniversary. Both are physically and verbally abusive towards one another.

Fancy watches as Buddy fixes the fence, holding a handmade doll while the local news reports on a missing 16-year-old boy. She goes out to flirt with Buddy on multiple occasions. Walter observes Fancy's advances. Jealous, he fires several shots at Buddy, pretending to practice his shooting skills. The tension only grows when Walter refuses to pay Buddy as much as previously agreed upon. Fancy invites Buddy for dinner while Walter sullenly looks on. Buddy declines, unknowingly setting up a way for Fancy to insult Walter in front of him. Unable to start or fix his truck, he turns to go inside.

As he reaches for the doorknob, the scene shifts to Buddy being questioned by Detective Jones, who recounts Buddy's juvenile record while a woman, Detective Newton (Zulay Henao), looks on. Jones asks if he is the kind of guy who secretly likes to hurt people, to which Buddy says he is not.

Buddy asks to use Walter's car, while leaving his equipment and truck, to check on his family. Buddy calls Lisa, who becomes upset with him. Fancy stirs something in a pot, seemingly in a trance. After a distinctly awkward dinner, Fancy gives Buddy a tour of the house while Walter is seemingly passed out drunk. The local news is on about the fourth teenage boy missing. They pass a door with many locks that Buddy queries Fancy about. She jokes with him and then claims it's storage.

In Fancy and Walter's bedroom, her favorite room, she changes behind a cloth screen and bids Buddy to sit on the bed. Buddy observes VooDoo figures on a mantel. Fancy confides that she has always wanted children, but says she is medically unable to. She begins to seduce Buddy with a series of questions about affairs and fantasies only to share one of her "young boy" fantasies with Buddy. Buddy becomes uncomfortable and tries to leave but inadvertently trips and falls, awakening Walter.

Upon hearing the noise, Walter noisily makes his way upstairs while Buddy remains supine on the ground. Not seeming to notice or care about Walter's approach, Fancy calmly walks over and places her golden heeled foot on Buddy's chest, moving it down his stomach. Walter makes his way to the bedroom, and Fancy uses her shoe's high heel to flick off the button on Buddy's jeans. The button lands just under the door. Walter leans his ear against the door, listening only to walk away without opening the door. Buddy quietly tells Fancy she is crazy.

Coming downstairs, Buddy views the local news on a TV, which states that the governor has declared a state of emergency and the National Guard is being called in. Buddy lies down on a couch. Later, Buddy awakens in a start, seeing Walter seated nearby, brandishing a revolver. Walter invites Buddy into the attic for a drink.

In the attic, the two men drink alcohol and exchange stories about their time in the military. Walter shares about his brief time as a Marine in 1970, seemingly overcome with survivor's guilt. Buddy is haunted by a memory in which he let a soldier die. Walter begins a tirade about the government exploiting young people to make money. He shows Buddy a small duffel bag full of cash, telling him to kill Fancy. Walter then gives Buddy some cyanide, explaining that Fancy is terminally ill and that she should be killed in an act of mercy. Buddy seems unsure but goes off to find Fancy. He finds her singing blues songs in the bathtub. She invites him in and they speak of their childhoods. She pulls him in for a kiss which he returns.

Detective Jones questions Buddy's story and morals. Buddy replied he had been feeling sexually frustrated before and that his emotional vulnerability and Fancy's appeal were to blame. Detective Jones implores Buddy to confess, but he refuses.

Buddy and Fancy have sex in the bathroom, after which Buddy hurriedly dresses and Fancy finds the cyanide. He says Walter had told him she was dying and had asked Buddy to kill her. Fancy thanks him for telling her and says that she won't tell him Buddy told her.

Walter is boarding up the windows from the inside of what Fancy says is his favorite room when he sees her walk by. She brings him a drink and says they should work on their resentment for one another with forgiveness. She then stabs him in the hand. Walter knocks her out and then points a gun at Buddy and blames him. Walter tells him to finish it with the cyanide. Buddy attacks Walter and ties him to the staircase railing. As Fancy asks Buddy to take her with him and run away with her, Walter tells Buddy how sadistic Fancy is. She tries to convince Buddy to have sex with her in front of Walter. Walter, who seems unconcerned, laughs and threatens Buddy and his family. As Fancy and Buddy leave, Walter tells Buddy to look in the basement while laughing. Buddy tries to open the door, but Fancy tries to convince him not to go down. As he takes a lock off Fancy begins shooting at him to Walter's delight. Buddy escapes to another room, where he finds a drugged boy imprisoned by the couple who asks for help. The boy warns Buddy that there are other prisoners. In the meantime, Fancy frees Walter, and together, they chase Buddy. Walter and Buddy fight, and as Buddy struggles with the front door, Fancy knocks him unconscious. The pair leaves Buddy bound in his truck, along with the now-dead boy. Buddy wakes as the police find him.

Detective Jones doesn't believe Buddy's story. Lisa comes to see him and is shown into the interrogation room. Detective Newton tells Jones she remembers a missing girl was seen wearing a dress of the same material Buddy saw a boy holding at the house. Led by Detective Newton, the police execute a search warrant on the house. They find several hostages and arrest Fancy, but Walter escapes. The police release Buddy to Lisa, who is heartbroken to learn of his infidelity with Fancy. She leaves him and moves in with her sister.

Sometime later, Buddy is enjoying breakfast in a diner when Walter, now clean-shaven and wearing a military dress uniform, arrives outside. He is holding Lisa hostage. Buddy admits that he let his friend in the military die, and Walter calls him a coward. Buddy switches places with his wife as the police arrive to negotiate since Walter wants Fancy's release. Walter releases Buddy and proceeds to deliver a speech, claiming his actions represent a sacrifice against the government for its poor treatment of veterans. During the ensuing shootout, Walter is shot and Buddy is wounded.

As Buddy recovers in the hospital, his wife forgives him for his actions and he holds his daughter. The couple resolves to repair their relationship.

A news reporter states that Walter and Fancy were holding teenage hostages in their basement and forcing them to have babies. The two Girl Scouts from earlier are found there as well, in an emaciated state. The film ends with a view of the  basement where the victims of Fancy and Walter were imprisoned. A reporter on the television states that no one can really know their neighbors.

Cast
Nicolas Cage as Walter, a hard-drinking Vietnam veteran who is haunted by his past.
KaDee Strickland as Fancy, an older woman who desperately wants children. 
Luke Benward as Buddy, a former USS Stark sailor who is currently working as a contractor.
Kelsey Grammer as Detective Jones
Zulay Henao as Detective Newton
Emily Marie Palmer as Lisa

Reception

Critical response
On Metacritic, the film has a weighted average score of 29 out of 100, based on four critics, indicating "generally unfavorable reviews".

Kristian Lin from Fort Worth Weekly gave a good review, praising the plot twists and the performances of Cage and Grammer. Dylan Andresen from Film Threat appreciated the film, writing that: "Generally, I enjoyed watching it, which already places it higher than most films out there. If you are a fan of Nick Cage, his acting antics, or just need a new film for the evening, then this one is most certainly worth a watch", giving to it a positive rating of 6/10.

Awards
Grand Isle won the Spotlight Award at Lone Star Film Festival and received a Special Mention at Noir Film Festival.

References

External links

2019 action thriller films
American action thriller films
American nonlinear narrative films
Films about veterans
Films shot in Louisiana
Films directed by Stephen Campanelli
2010s English-language films
2010s American films